Wolf Larsen is a 1958 American adventure film directed by Harmon Jones and starring Barry Sullivan and Peter Graves.

Plot
A mean-spirited ship captain keeps his crew under his autocratic thumb while indulging his more refined side. But when his men rise up in mutiny, Larsen forces the cultured Van Weyden to help him quash the uprising.

Cast
 Barry Sullivan as Wolf Larsen
 Peter Graves as Van Weyden
 Gita Hall as Kristina 
 Thayer David as Mugridge
 John Alderson as Johnson
 Rico Alaniz as Louis
 Robert Gist as Matthews
 Jack Grinnage as Leach
 Jack Orrison as Haskins
 Henry Rowland as Henderson
 Bob LaVarre as Crewmember

Production
In September 1956 producer Lindsay Parsons announced he would make a film called The Far Wanderer from a script by Turney Walker. It was to be about seal hunting and star Sterling Hayden, also using Hayden's yacht. Filming was to begin in November 1956 and finance came from Allied Artists. Gregg G. Tallas was  attached as director.

Eventually filming pushed back and Hayden dropped out, to be replaced by Barry Sullivan. However Hayden's yacht was still used. Filming began May 1958. The female lead went to Gita Hall, who was married to Sullivan at the time.

This was the sixth film version of London's novel. Larsen had been portrayed by Noah Beery Sr. in 1920 and Edward G. Robinson in 1941.

References

External links
 
 
 

1958 films
1958 adventure films
Allied Artists films
American adventure films
Films based on The Sea-Wolf
Films directed by Harmon Jones
Films scored by Paul Dunlap
Sea adventure films
1950s English-language films
1950s American films